Sri Sivasubramaniya Nadar College of Engineering (SSN), popularly known as SSN College of Engineering or simply SSN, is a private engineering college located in Chennai, Tamil Nadu, India. It is an autonomous college affiliated with Anna University founded by Shiv Nadar. The college is certified to ISO 9001:2000 standard by the National Board of Accreditation.

In March 2018, the college was granted autonomous status by UGC.

History 
Sri Sivasubramaniya Nadar College of Engineering(SSN) was started in 1996 by Padma Bhushan Dr Shiv Nadar. The college was opened in 1996 at a temporary location in Thoraipakkam in the suburbs of Chennai, Tamil Nadu  as an affiliate of  Anna University.  It later moved to a 230-acre campus at Kalavakkam (Thiruporur Panchayat) on Rajiv Gandhi Salai (Old Mahabalipuram Road) in 1998. Nadar took an active role in the college activities, including the gifting of Rs. 1 million worth of HCL shares to the college.

In association with Carnegie Mellon University, the SSN School of Advanced Software Engineering was started in 2001.

Courses offered B.E/B.Tech/ M.E/Ph.D. 

Chemical Engineering 

Mechanical Engineering 

Electronics and Communication Engineering 

Electrical and Electronics Engineering 

Information Technology 

Bio-Medical Engineering 

Computer Science and Engineering

Civil Engineering

Rankings

SSN is ranked 48 among engineering colleges in India by the National Institutional Ranking Framework (NIRF) in 2022 and 96 overall.

Placement Highlights 2022 Batch 

At the end of phase 1 placement season 2022, SSN hits record placements even during a turbulence pandemic situation

Number of offers received: 1315

Number of offers over 20 Lakh: 77

Number of offers over 10 Lakh: 315

Highest offer: 1.17 Crore per annum

Second highest offer: 84.24 Lakh per annum

The average salary for the top 10% selection: 29.52 Lakh per annum

The average salary for the top 25% selection:20.05 Lakh per annum

Notable alumni 

Ravichandran Ashwin, cricketer
 MK Balaji, playback singer
 Balaji Mohan, film director
 Anaka Alankamony, squash player
 Murugan Ashwin, Cricketer
 Pradeep Ranganathan, Film Director & Actor

See also
Shiv Nadar University

References

External links 

SSN College of Engineering official homepage

All India Council for Technical Education
Engineering colleges in Chennai
Academic institutions formerly affiliated with the University of Madras